Dublin bombing may refer to:
 Bombing of Dublin in World War II, 1941; 34 killed
 1972 and 1973 Dublin bombings, 3 killed
 Dublin and Monaghan bombings, 1974; 26 killed in Dublin
 Dublin Airport bombing, 1975; 1 killed